Steven Achikor is a Nigerian singer and songwriter. He is a finalist in the Bulgarian X Factor.

Career

Early life
Achikor no was born in Delta State, Nigeria in a big religious family, having 8 brothers and 2 sisters. When he was a kid, his dream was to become a footballer. He wanted to move in the United States, but in the early 2015 he started studying Informatics in the Varna Free University in Bulgaria. He decided to sign for the 4th season of X Factor Bulgaria and made it through the finals.

2015:X Factor Bulgaria
After coming to Bulgaria Steven heard for X Factor casting and signed for it. He made it through the finals as one of the three foreign people in the season 4 of the show. In the 4th live show he sang the Bulgarian song Облаче ле бяло and the judges stated that his performance was the best of the night as of the great feeling text and brilliant performance. On the 8th live show Stevie was for the first time on eliminations, but with the great performance of the song Ordinary People he was saved, making one of his teammates to leave the show.

2016-present: Solo career
Achikor released his first single featuring Nevena Peykova on 3 June 2016.

Discography

References

External links
 
 

Living people
21st-century Nigerian male singers
X Factor (Bulgarian TV series)
Nigerian expatriates in Bulgaria
Year of birth missing (living people)